Oberhavel – Havelland II is an electoral constituency (German: Wahlkreis) represented in the Bundestag. It elects one member via first-past-the-post voting. Under the current constituency numbering system, it is designated as constituency 58. It is located in northern Brandenburg, comprising the Oberhavel district and eastern parts of the Havelland district.

Oberhavel – Havelland II was created for the inaugural 1990 federal election after German reunification. Since 2021, it has been represented by Ariane Fäscher of the Social Democratic Party (SPD).

Geography
Oberhavel – Havelland II is located in northern Brandenburg. As of the 2021 federal election, it comprises the entirety of the Oberhavel district and the municipalities of Brieselang, Dallgow-Döberitz, Falkensee, Ketzin, Schönwalde-Glien, and Wustermark from the Havelland district.

History
Oberhavel – Havelland II was created after German reunification in 1990, then known as Oranienburg – Nauen. It acquired its current name in the 2002 election. In the 1990 through 1998 elections, it was constituency 273 in the numbering system. In the 2002 and 2005 elections, it was number 58. In the 2009 election, it was number 59. Since the 2013 election, it has been number 58.

Originally, the constituency comprised the districts of Oranienburg and Nauen. It acquired its current configuration in the 2002 election. Upon the abolition of the Nauen-Land Amt ahead of the 2005 election, the municipality of Retzow and the former municipality of Selbelang were transferred out of the constituency. In the 2017 election, it lost the municipality of Nauen.

Members
The constituency was first represented by Karl-Heinz Schröter of the Social Democratic Party (SPD) from 1990 to 1994, followed by Wolfgang Ilte from 1994 to 1998. Angelika Krüger-Leißner then served from 1998 to 2013. In 2013, it was won by Uwe Feiler of the Christian Democratic Union (CDU). Ariane Fäscher regained it for the SPD in 2021.

Election results

2021 election

2017 election

2013 election

2009 election

References

Federal electoral districts in Brandenburg
1990 establishments in Germany
Constituencies established in 1990